Department Store  (Italian:I grandi magazzini)  is a 1939 Italian "white-telephones" comedy film directed by Mario Camerini.

It was made at the Cinecittà studios in Rome. The film entered the competition at the 7th Venice International Film Festival.

Cast 
Vittorio De Sica as Bruno Zacchi  
 Assia Noris as Lauretta Corelli  
 Enrico Glori as Bertini, il capo del personale  
 Luisella Beghi as Emilia  
 Virgilio Riento as Gaetano 
 Milena Penovich as Anna  
 Andrea Checchi as Maurizio  
 Mattia Giancola as Pietro - il fratello di Anna
 Renato Alberini 
 Aldo Capacci as Il giovane dell'ascensore  
 Nino Crisman as L'ispettore dei magazzini 
 Dhia Cristiani as La commessa del reparto mobili  
 Dino De Laurentiis as Un fattorino 
 Peppino De Martino as L'impiegato addetto ai cartellini  
 Giovanni Ferrari
 Alba Ferrarotti as Una commessa  
 Diana Floriani as Una commessa  
 Nora Lenner as Una commessa  
 Loredana as Una commessa  
 Mirto Lusso 
 Nino Marchetti as L'ispettore dell'inchiesta  
 Bebi Nucci as Una commessa  
 Amalia Pellegrini as La signora che chiede gli impermeabili 
 Alfredo Petroni as Il direttore dei Grandi Magazzini  
 Amina Pirani Maggi as La signora dal beretto di lana  
 Giuseppe Rinaldi as Uno sciatore 
 Umberto Sacripante as Pietro  
 Carlo Simoneschi
 Dida Spaida as Lucia  
 Liliana Vismara as Rina 
 Liliana Zanardi as La segretaria del direttore  
 Nietta Zocchi as La commessa racchia

References

External links

1939 films
Films directed by Mario Camerini
Films set in department stores
1939 comedy films
Italian comedy films
Italian black-and-white films
Films scored by Alessandro Cicognini
1930s English-language films
1930s Italian films